Adipur is a town in Gandhidham Municipal Corporation of Kutch District in the state of Gujarat, India.

History

Adipur was initially founded as a refugee camp after the partition of India, in 1947, by the government of India. Its administration was passed onto a self-governing body called the Sindhu Resettlement Corporation Ltd (SRC). The person credited with the formation of this settlement was Bhai Pratap Dialdas, who requested land from Mahatma Gandhi for the (mostly Sindhi) immigrants from Sindh, Now West Pakistan. The Maharaja of Kutch, Vijayaraji donated  of land. in Adipur/Gandhidham, which was built on this land. Later the Indian Institute of Sindhology was established at Adipur is a center for advanced studies and research in the fields related to the Sindhi language, literature, art and culture.

Adipur is famous for Gandhi Samadhi and a huge number of Charlie Chaplin fans and impersonators.

Climate
The climate here is usual, there is virtually a trifle rainfall in a year in Adipur town.
This climate is considered to be BWh according to the Koppen-Geiger classification of climates.
The average annual temperature is 26.8c. The average rainfall is 375mm.

Education
Adipur has nine higher education institutions run by Gandhidham Collegiate Board(GCB):
 Tolani Commerce College
 Tolani College of Arts and Science
 Tolani Institute of Management Studies
 Tolani Foundation Gandhidham Polytechnic
 Tolani College of Pharmacy
 Tolani institute of law
 Tolani institute of commerce
 Dada Dukhayal College of Education
 Dr. H. R. Gajwani College of Education

Admissions were traditionally competitive with the rest of the district, but overall, due to the limited infrastructure surrounding the campuses, the populace is mostly local students from Anjar, Gandhidham, Adipur, and other surrounding towns.

Schools in the city include Excelsior Model School, Shri R.P Patel High School, St. Xavier's School, Sadhu Hiranand Navalrai Academy, Maitri Maha Vidyalaya, Modern School, Mount Carmel School and Twinkle Star School.

See also
 Gandhidham
 Anjar
 Kandla
 Galpadar

References

Cities and towns in Kutch district